European route E22 is one of the longest European routes. Many of the E-roads have been extended into Asia since the year 2000; the E22 was extended on 24 June 2002.

Route

United Kingdom 
Port of Holyhead 
: Holyhead - A494
Ewloe Interchange
: A55 - Ellesmere Port
Dunkirk Roundabout
: Ellesmere Port - Warrington
Lymm Interchange
: Warrington(Concurrency with )
Croft Interchange(Start of concurrency with )
: Warrington - Manchester
Eccles Interchange
: Manchester Outer Ring Road
Simister Island
: Manchester - Goole( /: Pontefract )
Langham Interchange(End of concurrency with )
: Goole - M180
North Ings Interchange
: Whole length
Barnetby Top
: M180 - A160
Brocklesby Interchange
: A180 - Immingham (Whole length)
Port of Immingham 

Netherlands 

Amsterdam
Knooppunt De Nieuwe Meer( //)
: Ring Amsterdam
Coenplein( /)
: Amsterdam - Zaandam
Knooppunt Zaandam
: Zaandam - Sneek
Folsgare
: Sneek
Sneek
: Sneek - Groningen
Groningen-West
: Groningen( / )
Westerbroek
: Groningen - German border
Bad Nieuweschans

Germany 
Bunde
: Dutch border - A 31 (Whole length)
Dreieck Bunde
: A 280 - Leer
Dreieck Leer
: Leer - Bremen
Dreieck Stuhr( /)
: Bremen  - Lübeck( /: Bremen )( /: Hamburg )( /: Hamburg )
Kreuz Lübeck( /)
: Lübeck - Grimmen
Stralsund
: Grimmen - Sassnitz(Concurrency with )
Sassnitz 

Elbe Crossing 

There are currently plans to reroute the E22 between Lübeck and Westerstede, to go north of Hamburg and Bremen over the A20, when this new motorway is built after 2020. The E22 would then use the planned tunnel under the Elbe at Drochtersen/Glückstadt.

Sweden 

Trelleborg (Start of concurrency with )
: Trelleborg - Malmö 
Trafikplats Petersborg
: Malmö(Concurrency with )()
Trafikplats Kronetorp(End of concurrency with )
: Malmö - Norrköping
Trafikplats Norrköping Södra( )
Norrköping

In Sweden, E-Roads do not have national numbers. There is currently no ferry across the Baltic Sea between Norrköping and Ventspils. The best ferry alternative is from Nynäshamn to Ventspils. The line is run by Scandlines.

Latvia 
Ventspils 
: Ventspils - Rīga
()
/: Rīga
()
//: Rīga
()
()
: Salaspils
: Salaspils - Tīnūži
()
: Tīnūži - Koknese
()
: Koknese - Jēkabpils
()
: Jēkabpils - Russian border
Zilupe

Russia 
Burachki
: Latvian border - Moscow (Whole length)( /: Pustoshka )
()(Start of concurrency with )
: Moscow Ring Road(End of concurrency with)(Start of concurrency with)
()(End of concurrency with )
: Moscow - Yelabuga
()
: Yelabuga - Perm
()
: Perm - Yekaterinburg
()
EKAD: Yekaterinburg Ring Road
()
: Yekaterinburg - Tyumen
()
()
: Tyumen - Ishim
()( /)
Ishim
Between Kazan and Igra, the road takes a detour over Yelabuga, because the shortest route between Kazan and Igra uses a ferry over the Vyatka River, and the road is a bad gravel road around that area. Both routes are visible in Google Streetview. A much used shortcut is Izhevsk - Votkinsk - Perm.

Between Perm and Ishim, the  follows the Trans-Siberian Railway.

Gallery

External links 
 UN Economic Commission for Europe: Overall Map of E-road Network (2007)
 E22 route near Jūrmala, Latvia

22
22
E022
E22
E022
22
E022
E022
E022
E022
E022
E022
2-0022
E022
2-0022
2-0022
2-0022
2-0022
2-0022
2-0022
2-0022
2-0022
2-0022
2-0022
2-0022
2-0022